The 1907 Birmingham Tramway accident was a fatal tram accident which occurred on 1 October 1907 in the city of Birmingham, England.

Events
A tram operated by City of Birmingham Tramways Company Ltd was going downhill on Warstone Lane in the Jewellery Quarter area of the city when its brakes failed and it ran away. At the junction of Warstone Lane and Icknield Street it overturned at high speed and skidded until it stopped on the other side of the street, smashing into the pavement. Two people died and 17 were injured. It is the deadliest tram accident in the area covered by the modern West Midlands county.

The tram's brakes were later found to have been faulty.

See also
List of tram accidents

References

History of Birmingham, West Midlands
Birmingham
Railway accidents and incidents in Birmingham, West Midlands
Birmingham
Railway accidents and incidents in Warwickshire
1900s in Birmingham, West Midlands
Runaway train disasters
Accidents and incidents involving City of Birmingham Tramways Company Ltd
1907 disasters in the United Kingdom
Tram accidents
October 1907 events